Bhavnagar Rural is one of the 182 Legislative Assembly constituencies of Gujarat state in India. It is part of Bhavnagar district.

List of segments
This assembly seat represents the following segments,

 Bhavnagar Taluka (Part) Villages – Rajgadh, Velavadar, Mithapar, Kanatalav, Adhelai, Bhadbhid, Ganeshgadh, Kotda, Jashavantpar, Gundala, Sanes, Savaikot, Savainagar, Nava Madhiya, Khetakhatli, Narbad, Kalatalav, Juna Madhiya, Devaliya, Paliyad, Undevi, Kamlej, Kardej, Bhojpura, Shampara Kho, Sodvadra, Shedhavadar, Fariyadka, Sidsar, Shampara(Sidsar), Adhewada, Budhel, Bhuteshwar, Bhumbhali, Thordi, Kobdi, Pithalpar, Rampar, Surka, Juna Ratanpar, Nava Ratanpar, Gundi, Vavdi, Sartanpar, Bhadi, Bhandariya, Nagdhaniba, Alapar, Bhadbhediya, Koliyak, Hathab, Khadsaliya, Thalsar, Lakhanka
 Ghogha Taluka – Entire taluka except village – Lakadiya
 Sihor Taluka (Part) Villages – Sedarda, Ukharla, Paldi, Navagam (Mota), Maglana, Ghanghali, Bhangadh, Nesda, Bholad, Khakhariya, Vadiya, Usrad, Pipaliya, Nana Surka, Kantodiya, Vav, Songadh, Mota Surka, Kachotiya, Rajpara (Khodiyar), Juna Jaliya, Dhrupka, Mahadevpara, Valavad, Karkoliya, Sar, Khambha, Bhadli, Rabarika, Kajavadar, Sihor (M).

Member of Legislative Assembly

Election results

2022

2017

2012

See also
 List of constituencies of Gujarat Legislative Assembly
 Gujarat Legislative Assembly
 Bhavnagar district

References

External links
 

Assembly constituencies of Gujarat
Bhavnagar district